Hattah station is a disused railway station in Hattah, Victoria, Australia. Although the station is no longer in use, the site retains a platform and modest station building.

External links
 Melway map at street-directory.com.au
 Vicrail Hattah photos

Disused railway stations in Victoria (Australia)